A Boy, a Girl and a Dog is a 1946 American drama film directed by Herbert Kline and written by Maurice Clark, Irving Fineman and Herbert Kline. The film stars Sharyn Moffett, Jerry Hunter, Harry Davenport, Lionel Stander, Charles Williams and Charlotte Treadway. The film, shot in part at the War Department's Canine Training Center in San Carlos, California was completed in 1944  but was not released until July 1, 1946, by Film Classics. The film was rereleased in 1951 by Astor Pictures as Lucky, the Outcast.

In 1960, producer W.R. Frank rereleased the film as a double feature with his 1949 horse film The Great Dan Patch.

Plot

Cast
Sharyn Moffett as Button
Jerry Hunter as Kip
Harry Davenport as Gramps
Lionel Stander as Jim
Charles Williams as Mr. Stone
Charlotte Treadway as Mrs. Foster
Howard Johnson as Lt. Stephens
John Vosper as Mr. Hamilton
Nancy Evans as Mrs. Hamilton

References

External links
 

1946 films
American drama films
1946 drama films
Film Classics films
American black-and-white films
Films about dogs
World War II films made in wartime
1940s English-language films
Films directed by Herbert Kline